Lumawigia is a genus of beetles in the family Buprestidae, the jewel beetles. They are native to the Philippines.

The genus was erected in 2005 with the description of the new species L. gibbicephala. A second species, L. leytensis, was described in 2009.

Species include:

 Lumawigia gibbicephala Bellamy, 2005
 Lumawigia leytensis Bellamy & Ohmomo, 2009

References

Buprestidae genera
Insects of the Philippines